This list of mills in Royton, lists textile factories that have existed in Royton, Greater Manchester, England.

A–E

F–J

K–O

P–T

U–Z

References

Bibliography

Royton
Royton
Buildings and structures in the Metropolitan Borough of Oldham
Royton
History of the textile industry
Industrial Revolution in England